Echo Bluff State Park is a public recreation area comprising  of land in Newton Township, Shannon County, Missouri, United States. The state park occupies the site of former Camp Zoe, a summer camp for children that opened in 1929. The park was named for the massive cliff that towers over one side of Sinking Creek.

History
The state acquired the former Camp Zoe site at auction from the federal government in 2013 for $640,000. An additional 80 acres was purchased for $455,000. Some $52 million was spent building a new lodge, playground, campgrounds, pavilions, and cabins. Federal grant money totalling $10.5 million helped pay for improving area roads and creating a new bridge over Sinking Creek. The park opened to the public on July 30, 2016.

Activities and amenities
The park features a lodge, cabins and campsites for overnight stays, bluff-top shelter for special events, and 50-seat amphitheater as well as hiking and mountain biking trails.

See also
 Schwagstock

References 

Protected areas of Shannon County, Missouri
State parks of Missouri
Protected areas established in 2013
2013 establishments in Missouri